Joy Ride (known as Roadkill in the United Kingdom) is a 2001 American road thriller horror film directed by John Dahl and written by J. J. Abrams and Clay Tarver. 

The film stars Paul Walker and Steve Zahn as two brothers embarking on a cross-country road trip, who play a cruel prank on a mysterious trucker who turns out to be a psychotic murderer, desperate to get revenge at any cost. 

The film was released on October 5, 2001, and received generally positive reviews from critics.

Plot
While traveling from California to Colorado to pick up his childhood friend and crush Venna, Lewis is forced to stop in Salt Lake City after he learns his estranged brother Fuller has been arrested. Lewis bails him out and Fuller tags along for the ride.

Fuller has a CB radio installed in Lewis' car and the two begin listening in on truckers' chatter. Fuller coaxes Lewis into playing a prank on a truck driver nicknamed Rusty Nail, asking him to pretend to be a woman named Candy Cane. They set up a meeting with Rusty Nail in a motel where Lewis and Fuller are spending the night; they tell Rusty Nail that Candy Cane will be in room 17, the room of an irritable and racist businessman with whom Fuller had an unpleasant encounter at the check in desk. When Rusty Nail arrives, the brothers listen from the adjoining room; an argument and sounds of a scuffle are briefly heard.

The next morning, Lewis and Fuller learn that the police found the businessman on the highway, with his lower jaw ripped off. Lewis admits they were involved and Sheriff Ritter accosts them for their role in the incident, but lets them go. Back on the road, Rusty Nail is heard again on the radio looking for Candy Cane. Lewis reveals the prank to Rusty Nail and he demands an apology, but Fuller insults him instead. Rusty Nail then notes they should get their taillight fixed, indicating he is following them. 

They drive to a nearby gas station and unsuccessfully attempt to contact Sheriff Ritter. Seeing a large truck pull into the gas station, they flee from the scene into a dead end, with the truck driver chasing them. The driver turns out to be a kind stranger trying to return Lewis's credit card, which he left behind in panic. The real Rusty Nail then shows up in his truck and, as he slowly crushes Lewis's car against a tree, Fuller hysterically apologizes. Rusty Nail drives away, declaring his actions to be simply a retaliatory joke.

Believing themselves safe, the brothers arrive in Colorado and pick up Venna. They stop at a motel and, as Lewis falls asleep, Rusty Nail calls his room, revealing he has noticed Venna has joined them. They flee from the motel, but see messages from Rusty Nail spray painted on road signs, instructing them to look in the trunk; they find the CB radio Fuller had previously thrown from the window of the car. Rusty Nail then contacts them again via the radio, announcing that he has kidnapped Venna's friend Charlotte, and he directs them to a cornfield where the three get split up. Rusty Nail kidnaps Venna.

Rusty Nail sets up a meeting at another motel in room 17, mirroring the false date with which he was pranked. He sets up a trap that will kill Venna if the room door is opened. Fuller attempts to get in the room by a back window, but is injured by Rusty Nail and gets stuck outside. Lewis attempts to free Fuller as the police arrive to help Venna. Meanwhile, Rusty Nail's truck appears uphill and begins rolling down towards the motel. The brothers free Venna in time and everyone escapes as the truck crashes into the motel. As the police investigate Rusty Nail's truck, they see a dead body in the driver's seat and Charlotte, still alive, in the back.

While Lewis, Fuller and Venna are treated for their injuries on scene, the dead man inside the truck turns out to be the friendly truck driver who returned Lewis's credit card. From the CB in the ambulance, the group hears Rusty Nail's voice, learning that he is alive and free.

Cast
 Paul Walker as Lewis Thomas
 Steve Zahn as Fuller Thomas
 Leelee Sobieski as Venna Wilcox
 Jessica Bowman as Charlotte Dawson
 Matthew Kimbrough (uncredited) as Rusty Nail. He is credited after all cast and crew in Spanish as "Clavo" meaning "nail".
 Ted Levine (uncredited) as Voice of Rusty Nail
 Stuart Stone as Danny, Lewis's roommate
 Brian Leckner as Officer Keeney
 Jim Beaver as Sheriff Ritter
 Hugh Dane as Man at door
 Jay Hernandez as Marine
 Basil Wallace as Car salesman
 Rachel Singer as Gas station manager
 Satch Huizenga as Mr. Jones
 Luis Cortés as Night manager
 Kenneth White as Ronald Ellinghouse
 Walton Goggins (deleted scenes) as Cop
 Anna Malle (uncredited) as Cable TV porn actress

Alternate footage
On the DVD release, there is a 29-minute-long alternate ending, and four other shorter alternate endings. The main one featured Rusty Nail's shotgun suicide and numerous bodies are found by the police in his trailer. One featured Rusty Nail being arrested, another being beaten in a fight with both Thomas brothers, another wherein he is blown up in his truck, and another saw Rusty Nail run over with his own truck. The ending featured in the actual theatrical cut of the film is the only ending in which Rusty Nail lives. There are also numerous deleted scenes.

In the alternate ending where Rusty Nail's truck explodes, there is a water tower behind the truck as it burns. The original intention was to have the truck hit the water tower and have the water come down and put the flames out so that it would be believable if Rusty Nail survived. However, time constraints kept the scene from being filmed. The water tower cost over $100,000.

Sobieski filmed two romantic interludes, one with Zahn and one with Walker during the shooting and re-shooting of the film. Both scenes ended up getting cut. This may explain why Venna appears to be romantically interested in both of them.

Release
Joy Ride opened theatrically on October 5, 2001, in 2,497 venues and earned $7.3 million in its opening weekend, ranking number five in the US box office. By the end of its run, the film grossed $22 million in the US and $14.7 million overseas for a worldwide total of $36.6 million.

Production
In August 1999, Paul Walker was cast in the film then under the working title of Squelch.

Reception
On review aggregator website Rotten Tomatoes, the film has an approval rating 74% based on 114 reviews, with an average rating of 6.61/10. The website's critics consensus states: "A well-constructed B-movie thriller, Joy Ride keeps up the necessary level of tension and chills. Critics also liked Zahn's performance as the goofball older brother".  On Metacritic, the film has a weighted average score of 75 out of 100 based on 31 critics, indicating "generally favorable reviews". Audiences polled by CinemaScore gave the film an average grade of "B+" on an A+ to F scale.

Sequels
The film was followed by two direct-to-video sequels, Joy Ride 2: Dead Ahead (2008) and Joy Ride 3: Roadkill (2014).

References

External links
 
 
 
 

2001 films
2000s road movies
American thriller films
2000s English-language films
Citizens band radio in popular culture
Films about pranks
Films set in the United States
Films shot in California
Films shot in Los Angeles
Films shot in Nevada
Films shot in Utah
Trucker films
20th Century Fox films
Bad Robot Productions films
Regency Enterprises films
20th Century Studios franchises
Films scored by Marco Beltrami
Films directed by John Dahl
Films produced by J. J. Abrams
Films with screenplays by J. J. Abrams
2001 horror films
2000s teen horror films
2000s American films